The Saturn Award for Best Actor is an award presented annually by the Academy of Science Fiction, Fantasy & Horror Films to honor the top works in science fiction, fantasy, and horror in film, television, and home video. The Saturn Awards were devised by Dr. Donald A. Reed, who felt that films within those genres were never given the appreciation they deserved. The physical award is a representation of the planet Saturn, surrounded with a ring of film. The award was initially and is still sometimes loosely referred to as a Golden Scroll. The award for Best Actor was first introduced in 1976 for the 1974 and 1975 years, to reward a lead performance by a male actor in film.

The record for most awards is held by Robert Downey, Jr. with four wins, followed by Mark Hamill with three, and then Jeff Bridges, Tom Cruise, and Harrison Ford (two each). Tom Cruise is the most nominated actor in the category with twelve nominations, followed by Downey, Jr. and Arnold Schwarzenegger with seven. Arnold Schwarzenegger holds the record for most nominations without a victory.  Anthony Hopkins and Martin Landau are the only actors to have won the Saturn Award for Best Actor and an Academy Award for the same role; however, Landau won the Academy Award for Best Supporting Actor and not Best Actor. The record for most wins for playing a same character is held by Downey Jr. and Hamill, who both won three times for playing Tony Stark and Luke Skywalker respectively.

Winners and nominees

1970s

1980s

1990s

2000s

2010s

2020s

Multiple nominations

12 nominations
 Tom Cruise

8 nominations
 Robert Downey, Jr.

7 nominations
 Arnold Schwarzenegger

6 nominations
 Harrison Ford

5 nominations
 Jeff Bridges
 Johnny Depp
 Viggo Mortensen
 Christopher Reeve
 William Shatner

4 nominations
 Christian Bale
 Pierce Brosnan
 Chris Evans
 Mark Hamill
 Hugh Jackman
 Will Smith
 Robin Williams
 Bruce Willis

3 nominations
 Jim Carrey
 George Clooney
 Daniel Craig
 Leonardo DiCaprio
 Anthony Hopkins
 Matthew McConaughey
 Tobey Maguire
 Jack Nicholson
 Brad Pitt

2 nominations
 Warren Beatty
 George Burns
 James Caan
 Nicolas Cage
 Kevin Costner
 Hume Cronyn
 Matt Damon
 Albert Finney
 Michael J. Fox
 Mel Gibson
 Jeff Goldblum
 Tom Hanks
 Daniel Kaluuya
 Christopher Lee
 Bill Murray
 Liam Neeson
 Gary Oldman
 Joaquin Phoenix
 Chris Pratt
 Keanu Reeves
 Ryan Reynolds

Multiple wins

4 wins
Robert Downey, Jr.

3 wins
Mark Hamill

2 wins
Jeff Bridges
Tom Cruise
Harrison Ford

External links
 

Actor (Film)